The women's high jump event at the 1999 All-Africa Games was held on 15 September at the Johannesburg Stadium.

Results

References

Athletics at the 1999 All-Africa Games